Crunchie is a brand of chocolate bar with a honeycomb toffee (or known as "sponge toffee" in Canada and "honeycomb" or "cinder toffee" in the UK as well as "hokey pokey" in New Zealand) sugar centre. It is made by Cadbury and was originally launched in the UK by J. S. Fry & Sons in 1929.

Size and variations

The Crunchie is sold in several sizes, ranging from "snack size" – a small rectangle – to "king size". The most common portion is a single-serve bar, about 1 inch wide by about 7 inches long, and about  inch deep (2.5 cm × 18 cm × 2 cm).

In the late 1990s, there was a range of limited edition Crunchies on sale in the UK. These included a lemonade bar and a Tango Orange bar, in which the chocolate contained the different flavourings. A champagne-flavoured bar was launched for New Year's Eve 1999. In South Africa, Cadbury sold a white chocolate version in a blue wrapper until recently.

Like other chocolate brands, Crunchie brand ice cream bars and cheesecake are also sold in some countries. Such products contain nuggets of the honeycomb.

In 2006, a "Crunchie Blast" variety of the product was launched, which featured "popping candy" inside the bar. It was soon discontinued; but an ice cream of the same name, which is Magnum (ice cream)-shaped honeycomb ice cream with popping candy covered in milk chocolate, is sold in the UK and Ireland.

In 2010, Cadbury's launched Crunchie Rocks, a mixture of chocolate, cornflakes and Crunchie.

Until September 2010, Crunchie was produced in the Somerdale, Keynsham plant in Somerset, UK; however, production has now transferred to Cadbury's new plant in Skarbimierz, Poland. Labels for these products do not state a country of origin, instead stating "Made in the EU under licence from Cadbury UK Ltd".

Violet Crumble is a very similar product that was invented in Australia in 1913. It continues to be produced there, with some small niche exports to other nations. A similar product, with or without a chocolate coating, is sold as sponge candy in the United States, although honeycomb in these forms are also available outside the US.

Limited editions
In 2000, a short-lived (but successful) sister chocolate bar was launched, called Crunchie Tango. It was co-produced by Cadbury and Britvic and featured Tango Orange flavouring. Other limited edition flavours included Lemonade, Champagne and Mint.
In the 1960s, a Crunchie Peppermint was also available.
An "Endless Crunchie" was released in 2013 for Christmas and contained 40 Crunchie bars.

Availability
The Crunchie bar is widely available in the United Kingdom, Ireland, Jordan, Canada, Australia, New Zealand, South Africa, and India. It is imported in other countries, including Cyprus, Hong Kong,  Malta, Nigeria, Panama, Lebanon,   Saudi Arabia, Malaysia, the Philippines, Portugal,  Singapore, Thailand, Sri Lanka, Nepal, Tahiti and less widely so in the United States.

Manufacture
During manufacture, the honeycomb toffee is produced in large slabs, and is cut up using a highly focused jet of oil, though in Canada rotary saws are used. The use of a blade would lead to fragmentation, while water would dissolve the honeycomb toffee. Oil prevents both of these happening, and produces uniform sharp-edged portions. The honeycomb toffee is then covered with chocolate, cooled, and packaged.

Nutrition information

Advertising
In Australia and New Zealand, Crunchie bars are widely known for having New Zealand's longest-running television advertisement, the "Crunchie Train Robbery" which won many awards and ran in unchanged form for over 20 years from the late 1970s.

In both Ireland and the United Kingdom, the Crunchie has been advertised since the 1980s with the slogan "Get that Friday feeling". Prior to the 1980s Crunchie was advertised as "Crunchie makes exciting biting". In 1991, Cadbury launched a TV ad campaign that made use of The Pointer Sisters song, "I'm So Excited", which became one of the longest running advert campaigns in television history, continuing to be used up until 2008.

Literary references
The Crunchie bar is mentioned in Enid Bagnold's 1935 novel National Velvet, as the Brown sisters' sweet of choice for the year.

Stuart buys Bertie a mint Crunchie bar in the 44 Scotland Street book "The Importance Of Being Seven" by Alexander McCall Smith.

See also
 Violet Crumble
List of chocolate bar brands
 List of confectionery brands

References

External links

 Get that Friday feeling
 Cadbury UK

British confectionery
Chocolate bars
Products introduced in 1929
Cadbury brands
Mondelez International brands
 Brand name confectionery